Believe is a 2016 American Christmas drama film directed and written by Billy Dickson. The film stars Ryan O'Quinn, Issac Ryan Brown, Danielle Nicolet, Shawnee Smith, and Lance E. Nichols. It was released theatrically by Freestyle Releasing and Smith Global Media on December 2, 2016.

Plot
In a small town facing tough economic times, business owner Matthew Peyton (Ryan O'Quinn) struggles between his desire for financial success and the responsibility of funding the annual Christmas pageant. Desperate business decisions ruin his popularity amongst his employees. Angered, employees seek their revenge on him. When Matthew meets Clarence (Issac Ryan Brown), a joyful boy who believes in miracles, he must make a choice: to do what is best for himself or to give faith a chance by opening his heart to help his community.

Cast
 Ryan O'Quinn as Matthew Peyton
 Issac Ryan Brown as Clarence Joseph
 Shawnee Smith as Dr. Nancy Wells
 Danielle Nicolet as Sharon Joseph
 Kevin Sizemore as Albert Bagley
 David DeLuise as Tom Blackhorn
 Lance E. Nichols as Mayor Harris
 James C. Burns as Bob Alexander
 Scott Summitt as Charlie
 Joey Naber as Nick
 Bryce Lenon as Sam

Release
Believe was released in the United States on December 2, 2016 and was expected to gross less than $1 million from 638 theaters in its opening weekend. It made $477,387 in its opening weekend.

Reception
On review aggregator website Rotten Tomatoes, the film has an approval rating of 33%, based on six reviews, with an average rating of 5.4/10.
The film received the Gold Award for Best Film of the Year in 2016 from The Christian Film Review.

See also
 List of Christmas films

References

External links
 
 
 
 
 

2016 films
2010s Christmas drama films
2016 independent films
American Christmas drama films
American independent films
American films about revenge
Films about Christianity
2016 directorial debut films
2016 comedy films
2010s English-language films
2010s American films